The 1844 Vermont gubernatorial election was held on September 3, 1844.

Following the suicide of his son, George, in January, incumbent Whig Governor John Mattocks declined to run for re-election.

Whig nominee William Slade defeated Democratic nominee Daniel Kellogg and Liberty nominee William R. Shafter with 51.53% of the vote.

General election

Candidates
Daniel Kellogg, Democratic, former United States Attorney for the District of Vermont, Democratic nominee for Governor in 1843
William R. Shafter, Liberty, farmer and judge
William Slade, Whig, former U.S. Representative

Results

References

1844
Vermont
Gubernatorial